Ceryx pseudovigorsi is a moth of the subfamily Arctiinae. It was described by Nieuwenhuis in 1946. It is found on Sulawesi.

References

Ceryx (moth)
Moths described in 1946